John Amabile may refer to:

 John Amabile (interior designer) (born 1964), Scottish interior designer
 John Amabile (American football) (1939–2012), American football scout
 John Amabile (bobsleigh) (born 1962), Puerto Rican bobsleigher